King of Ecstasy is the first compilation album and fourth album overall by rapper/DJ, Egyptian Lover. The album was released in 1989 for Egyptian Empire Records and featured his greatest hits from his previous three albums.

Track listing
"Sexy Style" (Greatest Hits Dub Mix) 7:22
"My House (On the Nile)" (Greatest Hits Mix) 9:04
"Freak-A-Holic" (12" Dub Mix) 7:15
"You're So Fine" (Greatest Hits Edit) 6:48
"Egypt, Egypt" (12" Original Mix) 6:49
"The Alezby Inn" (Remodeled Vocal Version) 9:31
"The Lover" (12" Long Mix) 9:56
"Girls" (Dub Mix) 9:31

References

Egyptian Lover compilation albums
Albums produced by Egyptian Lover
1989 compilation albums